Christopher Douglas Stewart (born July 15, 1960) is an American politician, author and businessman serving as the U.S. representative for Utah's 2nd congressional district since 2013. A member of the Republican Party, he is known for his bestsellers Seven Miracles That Saved America and The Miracle of Freedom: Seven Tipping Points That Saved the World, as well as his series The Great and Terrible.

Stewart graduated from Utah State University in 1984 before joining the United States Air Force. Later, he began writing novels and became president and CEO of the Shipley Group. In 2020, Stewart won a fifth term in the House of Representatives, defeating Democratic nominee Kael Weston.

Early life and education
Stewart was born in Logan, Utah, and grew up on a dairy farm in Cache Valley. His father was a retired Air Force pilot and teacher. His mother, Sybil S. Stewart, was a full-time homemaker and was recognized as the Utah Mother of the Year in 1996.

Stewart graduated from Sky View High School in 1978 and entered Utah State University that year. After a year in college, he served as a missionary for the Church of Jesus Christ of Latter-day Saints in Texas. After his church service, Stewart reentered Utah State, and in 1984 earned a degree in economics from its College of Business.

Military service
Stewart served in the Air Force for 14 years, initially flying rescue helicopters and then transitioning to fixed-wing jets and flying the B-1B bomber. He was stationed at Dyess Air Force Base, Mountain Home Air Force Base, and other Air Force bases.

After college, Stewart was accepted into the Air Force's Officer Training School, followed by assignment to Undergraduate Pilot Training, graduating at the top of his class in both instances. Stewart flew both helicopters and jet aircraft in the military.

In 1995, Stewart was awarded the Mackay Trophy for "significant aerial achievement" for the combat capability operation known as Coronet Bat. On June 3, 1995, Stewart and a flight of two B-1s set the world record for the fastest nonstop flight around the world. He was the mission's senior project officer. The mission's purpose was to demonstrate the B-1 Lancer's capability with live bombing activity over three bombing ranges on three continents in two hemispheres. In the process, the team set three world records, flying 36,797.65 kilometers in 36 hours and 13 minutes.

Private sector career

Business career
After his military career, Stewart entered the private sector. He was president and CEO of the Shipley Group, a consulting company that specializes in energy and environmental issues. Shipley also participates in government anti-terrorism training, corporate security and executive preparedness consulting. Stewart sold his majority ownership in Shipley Group in December 2012 before being sworn in as a U.S. congressman.

Writing career
Stewart began writing books in the late 1990s. His first novel, Shattered Bone, was published in 1998. Stewart wrote four additional techno-thrillers before he began writing the series The Great and Terrible. Before completing his last book in that series, he started writing historical novels. His book Seven Miracles That Saved America was chosen as "Book of the Month", and The Miracle of Freedom: Seven Tipping Points That Saved the World became a New York Times Bestseller within two weeks of publication and was selected for the National Communications Award by the Freedom Foundation at Valley Forge. The Miracle of Freedom and Seven Miracles That Saved America were co-written with his brother, U.S. district judge Ted Stewart. The Miracle of Freedom was endorsed by radio/talk show host Glenn Beck, who has been credited for making the book a bestseller. Stewart has written 14 books. He worked with Elizabeth Smart to co-write her memoir, My Story. In 2005, the Mormon Tabernacle Choir performed A Christmas Bell for Anya, which he co-authored with his wife Evie.

U.S. House of Representatives

Elections

2012
On October 21, 2011, Utah Policy wrote that Stewart was going to run for Congress in Utah's 2nd congressional district. His formal announcement took place on December 6, 2011.

In February 2012, Stewart released a campaign video expressing his view that "if we don’t make some difficult decisions now, if we don’t show the courage to do what we have to do to save our country, we won’t make it for another 10 years." He also said that "at critical times in our history... we literally had miracles where God intervened to save us."

On April 21, 2012, at a controversial nominating convention, Stewart secured the Republican nomination. Before the convention, an anonymous anti-Stewart mailer was sent to convention delegates. In his speech to delegates, another candidate, Milt Hanks, alleged that the other candidates had made an anti-Stewart pact. Stewart's opponents considered the mailer and the allegations to be a set-up to elicit sympathy for Stewart's candidacy; they later filed a complaint with the Federal Elections Commission over the incident. A subsequent party inquiry showed no proof of wrongdoing by any candidate.

Stewart won the general election with 62% of the vote, defeating Jay Seegmiller, and took office on January 3, 2013.

2014
In the 2014 election, Stewart was challenged by Luz Robles, a state senator and vice president of Zions Bank. Robles suspended campaigning for two months to serve as caregiver for her daughter and mother, who were seriously injured in a car accident.

2016
In the 2016 election, Stewart faced Charlene Albarran, a business owner. Stewart defeated Albarran with 62% of the vote.

2018

Stewart faced Shireen Ghorbani, an Iranian-American, in the 2018 election. As of April 2018, Stewart had six times as much cash on hand as Ghorbani. Stewart defeated Ghorbani with 56% of the vote.

2020
UtahPolicy.com reported the Democratic Congressional Campaign Committee considered Stewart potentially vulnerable to a strong opponent, due to Donald Trump's unpopularity in the 2nd District and Stewart's record of defending him.

A poll taken in January 2020 among likely voters showed Stewart with 38% of the vote and a Democratic challenger with 36% of the vote. The remainder were undecided or voting for someone else.

Stewart defeated Kael Weston, a former State Department employee, in the general election.

Tenure
Stewart chaired the House Subcommittee on the Environment.

In 2016, Stewart introduced a bill to allow unused Ebolavirus funding to research and combat the Zika virus. In 2017, the proposal was adopted as part of a separate bill, the Zika Response Appropriations Act, which shifted $622 million in unused Ebola funding to fight Zika.

A July 2019 poll showed Stewart with the lowest approval rating of any Utah congressperson.

Committee assignments
 Permanent Select Committee on Intelligence HPSCI Majority Members | The Permanent Select Committee on Intelligence
 Committee on Appropriations
 Subcommittee on Labor, Health and Human Services, Education, and Related Agencies
 Subcommittee on Interior, Environment, and Related Agencies
 Subcommittee on the Legislative Branch

Caucus memberships
 Republican Study Committee
Anti-Socialism Caucus (chair)
 Congressional Western Caucus
United States Congressional International Conservation Caucus
U.S.-Japan Caucus

Electoral history

Political positions

Healthcare

According to his website, since arriving in Congress, Stewart has "consistently supported efforts to defund and repeal Obamacare." He co-sponsored the Defund Obamacare Act of 2013 and supported other efforts to "repeal, defund or dismantle the law." He also promised to "continue to do all that [he] can to seek strategic opportunities to... defund, delay and repeal this healthcare law." In place of Obamacare, Stewart supported the American Healthcare Reform Act.

Environment

As of 2013, Stewart rejected the idea that climate change is caused by human activity.

In 2014, Stewart sponsored H.R. 1422 (113th Congress), the EPA Science Advisory Board Reform Act of 2014, which would reform the composition and activities of the Environmental Protection Agency's science advisory board. Under the bill, at least 10% of the members of the board would be required to be from state, local, or tribal governments, corporate and industry experts would no longer be excluded from the board, and board members would be prohibited from advising the EPA in discussions that cite their work. The bill was opposed by Democrats and critics such as the Union of Concerned Scientists, who said it would enable conflicts of interest and restrict scientists' ability to provide proper advice to the government.

Stewart has a 3% lifetime rating from the League of Conservation Voters.

Economic issues

During the 2012 campaign, Stewart stated "we can’t continue to have 1.2-, 1.3-, 1.4-trillion-dollar deficits for the foreseeable future and just pretend that that’s not going to matter, because it will."

Stewart supports simplifying the tax code, lowering the corporate tax rate, and eliminating the estate tax. He voted for the Tax Cuts and Jobs Act of 2017.

LGBT rights
Stewart is the lead sponsor of the Fairness for All Act, a Republican alternative to the Equality Act. In 2015, he expressed his disagreement with Obergefell v. Hodges, in which the Supreme Court held that same-sex marriage bans violate the constitution.

On July 19, 2022, Stewart and 46 other Republican Representatives voted with the Democrats for the Respect for Marriage Act, which would codify the right to same-sex marriage in federal law.

Bundy standoff

In an interview regarding the Bundy standoff of 2014, Stewart said that the Bureau of Land Management could have avoided the standoff by allowing local sheriffs to intervene. Citing concerns about the level of weaponry federal agents carried, he also sponsored a bill (H.R. 4934) to demilitarize federal regulatory agencies.

Donald Trump

Stewart is considered "one of President Trump's most steadfast defenders in Congress." For instance, after Trump said he would be open to receiving intelligence on a campaign opponent from a foreign country and not alerting the FBI, Stewart defended him, saying that if the information is "credible, I think it would be foolish not to take that information." According to Ellen Weintraub, the chairwoman of the Federal Election Commission, it is illegal for a campaign to accept anything of value from a foreign person or entity in regard to a U.S. election.

According to political polling and reporting website FiveThirtyEight, Stewart's votes aligned with Trump's positions about 95% of the time. Stewart was reportedly under consideration to serve in the Trump administration as acting Director of National Intelligence, but Richard Grenell was chosen instead.

During the 2016 Republican presidential primary, Stewart was critical of Trump. Addressing an audience at the Hinckley Institute of Politics, Stewart compared him to fascist dictator Benito Mussolini, saying, "if some of you are Donald Trump supporters, we see the world differently, because I can't imagine what someone is thinking."

Mueller investigation

After Attorney General William Barr released a redacted version of the Mueller Report, Stewart released the following statement:

Stewart's statement did not address the issue of obstruction of justice. The Mueller Report stated that "while this report does not conclude that the President committed a crime, it also does not exonerate him" from the charge of obstruction of justice.

After the report's release, Stewart accused the "former leadership" of the FBI, the Department of Justice, and the CIA of "astounding" corruption, without providing any details or supporting evidence. He also called for a second special counsel to investigate Hillary Clinton's emails and allegations of spying on the Trump campaign that led to the Mueller investigation.

Stewart was the only member of Congress from Utah to question Mueller during his appearance before Congress on July 24, 2019. He confronted Mueller about leaks that he asserted came from Mueller's office and were allegedly "designed to weaken or embarrass" Trump. Others, including Washington, D.C.-area media reporters, considered Mueller's office an unlikely source of the leaks.

Ukraine scandal and impeachment inquiry

Stewart defended Trump's actions with regard to the Trump–Ukraine scandal. In his opening statement during impeachment proceedings as a member of the House Intelligence Committee, Stewart apparently characterized the impeachment inquiry as a coup d'état when he said, "the coup has started", but later declined to clarify his remark.

During the impeachment hearings, Stewart repeatedly defended Trump's behavior, criticized witnesses whose testimony implicated Trump in wrongdoing, and criticized the impeachment process. He called for Adam Schiff, the chair of the United States House Permanent Select Committee on Intelligence, to recuse himself from the investigation of Trump's dealings.

When Trump called for Senator Mitt Romney's "impeachment" and Stewart was asked to comment, he declined to defend Romney. Romney had expressed support for the committee's inquiry. (Senators cannot be impeached.)

On December 18, 2019, Stewart voted against both articles of impeachment against Trump. Of the 195 Republican representatives who voted, all voted against both impeachment articles.

Immigration

Stewart supports DACA.

Foreign policy 
In June 2021, Stewart was one of 49 House Republicans to vote to repeal the AUMF against Iraq.

References

External links
 Congressman Chris Stewart
 Chris Stewart for Congress
 
 
 

|-

1960 births
21st-century American politicians
21st-century American historians
21st-century American male writers
American historical novelists
American Latter Day Saints
American male non-fiction writers
American male novelists
American thriller writers
Latter Day Saints from Utah
Living people
Military personnel from Utah
Politicians from Logan, Utah
Republican Party members of the United States House of Representatives from Utah
Utah State University alumni